Oscar Torres (born 29 May 1959) is a Venezuelan footballer. He played in two matches for the Venezuela national football team in 1983. He was also part of Venezuela's squad for the 1983 Copa América tournament.

References

External links
 

1959 births
Living people
Venezuelan footballers
Venezuela international footballers
Place of birth missing (living people)
Association football midfielders
Estudiantes de Mérida players